Scott Tong is an American journalist and radio host. He is a former correspondent for Marketplace on APM. He is the co-host of Here & Now along with Robin Young and Deepa Fernandes.

Tong has a BA in government from Georgetown University, and is the author of A Village With My Name: A Family History of China’s Opening to the World (University of Chicago Press, 2017)

References

External links

American public radio personalities
Year of birth missing (living people)
Living people
Georgetown College (Georgetown University) alumni
American people of Chinese descent
Place of birth missing (living people)